Sanchi railway station is a small railway station in Raisen district, Madhya Pradesh. Its code is SCI. It serves Sanchi Town. The station consists of two platforms, neither well sheltered. It lacks many facilities including water and sanitation. The station is located around 1.5 km away from UNESCO World Heritage Site of Sanchi stupas.

In October 2014, it was announced that Sanchi railway station will become a multi-functional complex and will be equipped with various amenities for travellers.

References

Railway stations in Raisen district
Bhopal railway division